Zalmunna is a genus of plant bugs in the tribe Mirini.

References 

 Oriental Rhynchota Heteroptera. WL Distant, Journal of Natural History, 1909
 Rhynchotal notes — XLVI. WL Distant, Journal of Natural History, 1909
 Descriptions of Oriental Capsidæ. WL Distant, Journal of Natural History, 1909

External links 
 

 Zalmunna at insectoid.info

Miridae genera
Mirini